In Irish mythology, Rinnal (Rindal, Rionnal, Rinnan) son of Genann of the Fir Bolg became High King of Ireland when he overthrew Fiacha Cennfinnán. He is said to have been the first king in Ireland to use spearheads (cf. Old Irish rind, rinn, (spear-)point).

He ruled for five or six years (depending on the source) before being overthrown by his cousin Fodbgen, son of Sengann.

Primary sources
 Lebor Gabála Érenn
 Annals of the Four Masters
 Geoffrey Keating's Foras Feasa ar Érinn

Legendary High Kings of Ireland
Fir Bolg